Frederick Rogers Graves (October 23, 1858 – May 17, 1940) was an American missionary to China and was the longest serving bishop in China.

Graves succeeded William Jones Boone to serve as the fifth missionary bishop of the Anglican diocese of Shanghai from 1893 to 1937. Graves assisted in the organization of the Chung Hua Sheng Kung Hui, and served as chairman of its House of Bishops from 1915 to 1926. Due to his position as a bishop, he had heavily involved in the administration of St. John's University, Shanghai. He resigned his See effective October 9, 1937. He was succeeded by William Payne Roberts.

Graves participated in the consecration of a number of other bishops, including
Daniel Trumbull Huntington
William Payne Roberts
James Addison Ingle
Sidney Catlin Partridge, first Bishop of Kyoto

References

External links
CSCA Chung Hua Sheng Kung Hui Source Documents
Historical documents on Anglicanism in China from Project Canterbury

Christian missions in China
1858 births
1940 deaths
Episcopal bishops of Shanghai
20th-century Anglican bishops in China
Anglican missionary bishops in China